The Texas Road, also known as the Shawnee Trail, Sedalia Trail, or  Kansas Trail, was a major trade and emigrant route to Texas across Indian Territory (later Oklahoma, Kansas, and Missouri).  Established during the Mexican War by emigrants rushing to Texas, it remained an important route across Indian Territory until Oklahoma statehood.  The Shawnee Trail was the earliest and easternmost route by which Texas Longhorn cattle were taken to the north. It played a significant role in the history of Texas, Oklahoma, Missouri, and Kansas in the early and mid-1800s.

The Shawnee Trail route
"Of the principal routes by which Texas Longhorn cattle were taken afoot to railheads to the north, the earliest and easternmost was the Shawnee Trail. Used before and just after the Civil War, the Shawnee Trail gathered cattle from east and west of its main stem, which passed through Austin, Waco, and Dallas. It crossed the Red River at Rock Bluff, near Preston, and led north along the eastern edge of what became Oklahoma, a route later followed closely by the Missouri-Kansas-Texas Railroad. The drovers took over a trail long used by Indians in hunting and raiding and by southbound settlers from the Midwest; the latter called it the Texas Road. North of Fort Gibson, the cattle route split into terminal branches that ended in such Missouri points as St. Louis, Sedalia, Independence, Westport, and Kansas City, and in Baxter Springs and other towns in eastern Kansas.  Early drovers referred to their route as the cattle trail, the Sedalia Trail, the Kansas Trail, or simply the trail.  Why some began calling it the Shawnee Trail is uncertain, but the name may have been suggested by a Shawnee village on the Texas side of the Red River just below the trail crossing or by the Shawnee Hills, which the route skirted on the eastern side before crossing the Canadian River."

The Shawnee Trail, followed the route from Colbert's Ferry, Indian Territory, in the south, across the Chickasaw, Choctaw, and Cherokee Nations, to Baxter Springs, Kansas, in the north. Later, the Shawnee Trail branched further west. The first route was then called the East Shawnee Trail and the branch called the West Shawnee Trail.  The East Shawnee Trail followed the Grand River to Fort Gibson. The West Shawnee Trail which started in Missouri and passed through Fort Wayne before joining the other trail continuing to the Red River on the Texas border.  Several stations were set up along the road where travelers could rest and refresh their horses.  The western branch particularly remained the main cattle trail from Texas until the opening of the Chisholm Trail (or Abilene Trail) following the Civil War.

History of the Trail

Texas herds were taken up the Shawnee Trail as early as the 1840s, and use of the route gradually increased, but by 1853, trouble had begun to plague some of the drovers. In June of that year, as 3,000 cattle were trailed through western Missouri, local farmers blocked their passage and forced the drovers to turn back. This opposition arose from the fact that the Longhorns carried ticks that bore a serious disease that the farmers called Texas fever. The Texas cattle were immune to this disease, but the ticks that they left on their bedding areas infected the local cattle, causing many to die and making others unfit to sell. Some herds avoided the blockades, and the antagonism became stronger and more effective. In 1855, angry farmers in western and central Missouri formed vigilance committees, stopped some of the herds, and killed any Texas cattle that entered their counties. Missouri stockmen in several county seats called on their legislature for action. The outcome was a law, effective in December of that year, which banned diseased cattle from being brought into or through the state. This law failed, though, since the Longhorns were not themselves diseased. Farmers formed armed bands that turned back some herds, though others managed to get through. Several drovers took their herds north through the eastern edge of Kansas, but there, too, they met opposition from farmers, who induced their territorial legislature to pass a protective law in 1859.

During the Civil War the Shawnee Trail was virtually unused for cattle drives.  However both sides of the Civil War used the road heavily to move supplies and troops.  Union and Confederate forces fought over control of the route, clashing at the Battle of Honey Springs and Battle of Baxter Springs on the road.

After the war, with Texas overflowing with surplus cattle with almost no local markets, pressure for trailing became stronger than ever. In the spring of 1866, an estimated 200,000 to 260,000 cattle were pointed north. Although some herds were forced to turn back, others managed to get through, while still others were delayed or diverted around the hostile farm settlements. James M. Daugherty, a Texas youth of 16, was one who felt the sting of the vigilantes. Trailing his herd of 500 steers north, he was attacked in southeastern Kansas by a band of Jayhawkers dressed as hunters. The mobsters stampeded the herd and killed one of the trail hands (some sources say they tied Daugherty to a tree with his own picket rope, then whipped him with hickory switches.). After being freed and burying the dead cowboy, Daugherty recovered about 350 of the cattle. He continued at night in a roundabout way and sold his steers in Fort Scott at a profit.

With six states enacting laws in the first half of 1867 against trailing, Texas cattlemen realized the need for a new trail that would skirt the farm settlements and thus avoid the trouble over tick fever. In 1867, a young Illinois livestock dealer, Joseph G. McCoy, built market facilities at Abilene, Kansas, at the terminus of the Chisholm Trail.  The new route to the west of the Shawnee Trail soon began carrying the bulk of the Texas herds, leaving the earlier trail to dwindle for a few years and expire.

The Texas Road eventually became part of U.S. Route 69.

See also
Shawnee Trail (West Virginia), a portion of the Great Indian Warpath (Seneca Trail)
http://www.redriverhistorian.com/shawneetrail.html, an online article about this trail

References

 Foreman, Grant. "Early Trails Through Oklahoma", Chronicles of Oklahoma 3:2 (June 1925) 99-119 (accessed August 16, 2006).
 BIBLIOGRAPHY: Wayne Gard, "The Shawnee Trail," Southwestern Historical Quarterly 56 (January 1953). Joseph G. McCoy, Historic Sketches of the Cattle Trade of the West and Southwest (Kansas City, Missouri: Ramsey, Millett, and Hudson, 1874; rpt., Philadelphia: Porcupine, 1974). From the Shawnee Trail website with permission from the Shawnee Trail Partnership.

Historic trails and roads in Texas
Historic trails and roads in Kansas
Historic trails and roads in Missouri
Historic trails and roads in Oklahoma
Indian Territory in the American Civil War
Texas in the American Civil War
Kansas in the American Civil War
Trails and roads in the American Old West
U.S. Route 69